Coleophora tragacanthae is a moth of the family Coleophoridae.

The larvae feed on the leaves of Tragacantha karakalensis.

References

tragacanthae
Moths described in 1988